Clazolam (SAH-1123), also referred to as isoquinazepon, is a drug which is a fused benzodiazepine and tetrahydroisoquinoline derivative. It was developed in the 1960s but was never marketed. It possesses anxiolytic effects and is also claimed to have antidepressant properties.

See also 
 Benzodiazepine
 Tetrahydroisoquinoline

References 

Lactams
Chloroarenes
Benzodiazepines
Tetrahydroisoquinolines
GABAA receptor positive allosteric modulators
Abandoned drugs